Kılıçlı may refer to:

 Kılıçlı, Ağaçören, a village in Aksaray Province, Turkey
 Kılıçlı, Taşköprü, a village
 Kılıçlı, Yüreğir, a village in Adana Province, Turkey
 Deniz Kılıçlı (born 1990), Turkish basketball player

See also
 Qılıçlı (disambiguation)

Turkish-language surnames